Nicholas Ryan Waterhouse  (born February 8, 1986) is an American singer-songwriter and record producer from Los Angeles. He is a guitarist and singer known for a sound rooted in rhythm & blues, jazz, and soul.

Early life
Waterhouse was born in Santa Ana, California. He was raised in Huntington Beach, California, the son of a fireman and a saleswoman. He took up guitar at age 12. As a young teen he found himself more interested in increasingly obscure and eclectic Americana outside of the pop and contemporary rock of his peers. He has cited Bert Berns, Mose Allison, John Lee Hooker, Van Morrison, and a reading of Peter Guralnick's portrait of Dan Penn as early influences in his musical development.

Waterhouse started his career as guitarist and singer-songwriter with Intelligista (2002–2003), a combo compared to the Animals and High Numbers-era Who. This band performed in the Orange County underground music scene that yielded artists such as Ty Segall, Mikal Cronin, The Growlers, Cold War Kids. In 2002, the band entered the Distillery in Costa Mesa to record a radio broadcast and a 7-inch single, beginning a friendship between Waterhouse and owner-engineer Mike McHugh. At the end of high school, the band split, finding Waterhouse attending San Francisco State University in San Francisco.

In San Francisco, Waterhouse continued pursuing playing music with little luck, concurrently becoming more involved with the burgeoning DJ community. During this time, he became a fixture at the all-vinyl Rooky Ricardo's Records in the Lower Haight District, eventually taking a job. He has repeatedly cited apprenticeship to owner Richard Vivian and the shop's connections to local soul club scene as a great influence. During this time he also struck up a friendship with Matthew Correia, later of the Allah-Las.

Musical career
Waterhouse recorded his debut single in late 2010 at the Distillery Studio in Southern California. "Some Place", backed with "That Place" was recorded with a pickup group billed as the Turn-Keys, featuring Ira Raibon of the Fabulous Souls playing saxophone. The initial release of "Some Place" in November 2010 was on Waterhouse's own PRES imprint. The single was recorded, mixed, and mastered completely analog to lacquer, plated and hand-pressed. The labels were handset letterpress printed. Copies of "Some Place" sell for as much as $300.

On the strength of the self-distributed single, Waterhouse assembled a backing group, The Tarots, as well as taking on a trio of female vocalists, The Naturelles. This line up coalesced in time for a debut performance in the last week of December 2010.
His earliest performances were with artists such as Ty Segall, The Strange Boys, White Fence, and most frequently, The Allah-Las. He signed with Innovative Leisure Records in March 2011. He relocated from San Francisco to Los Angeles in 2012, and began touring North America and Europe, as well as working as producer on the Allah-Las 2012 self-titled debut.

In May 2012, his debut album, Time's All Gone, was released on Innovative Leisure Records.

Waterhouse toured North America and Europe with the Allah-Las through 2012 in support of Time's All Gone. Another European tour in Spring 2013 found him playing Germany, France, Belgium, Netherlands, Switzerland, Spain (with an appearance at the Primavera Sound Festival, and the UK. He continued his production work on the Allah-Las' sophomore release "Worship The Sun", released in 2014.

Nick was Daryl Hall's guest on Live From Daryl's House, Episode 58, September 15, 2012.

Waterhouse appeared in a commercial for the Lexus CT hybrid in 2014, performing "Time's All Gone Pt. 1". His second LP, Holly, was issued in March of that year by Innovative Leisure Records.

His song, "This Is A Game" was featured in the popular PlayStation game MLB 14: The Show.

Waterhouse's third studio album Never Twice was released on September 30, 2016.

His song Katchi was remixed by the French duo Ofenbach in 2017 and reached #1 in the French charts.

In January 2018, Nick Waterhouse entered the studio to begin recording his fourth studio album. On January 9, 2019, it was confirmed that his new self-titled album would release on March 8, 2019. 

Waterhouse released his fifth studio album, "Promenade Blue" on April 9, 2021.

Discography

Singles and EPs
"Some Place" b/w "That Place" – Pres 2010
"Is That Clear" b/w "I Can Only Give You Everything" – IL 2011
"Don't You Forget It" – Record Store Day split w/Allah-Las 2012
"Say I Wanna Know" b/w "(If) You Want Trouble" – IL 2012
"Raina" b/w "Don't You Forget It" – IL 2013
"This Is A Game" b/w "It No. 3" – IL 2014 / Pres 2014
"It's Time" -IL 2016

Albums
Time's All Gone – IL, 2012
 "Say I Wanna Know"
 "Some Place"
 "Don't You Forget It"
 "I Can Only Give You Everything"
 "Raina"
 "(If) You Want Trouble"
 "Indian Love Call"
 "Is That Clear"
 "Teardrop Will Follow You"
 "Time's All Gone, Pt. 1"
 "Time's All Gone, Pt. 2"
Holly – IL, 2014
 "High Tiding"
 "This is a Game"
 "It No. 3"
 "Let It Come Down"
 "Sleepin' Pills"
 "Holly"
 "Dead Room"
 "Well It's Fine"
 "Ain't There Something That Money Can't Buy"
 "Hands on the Clock"
Never Twice – IL, 2016
 "It's Time"
 "I Had Some Money (But I Spent it)"
 "Straight Love Affair"
 "Stanyan Street"
 "The Old Place"
 "Katchi"
 "Baby, I'm In The Mood For You"
 "Tracy"
 "Lucky Once"
 "LA Turnaround"
Nick Waterhouse – IL, 2019
 "By Heart"
 "Song for Winners"
 "I Feel An Urge Coming On"
 "Undedicated"
 "Black Glass"
 "Wreck The Rod"
 "Which Was Writ"
 "Man Leaves Town"
 "Thought & Act"
 "El Viv"
 "Wherever She Goes (She Is Wanted)"
Promenade Blue - IL, 2021
"Place Names"
"The Spanish Look"
"Vincentine"
"Medicine"
"Very Blue"
"Silver Bracelet"
"Promene Bleu"
"Fugitive Lover"
"Minor Time"
"B. Santa Ana. 1986"
"To Tell"
The Fooler - IL, 2023
"Looking For A Place"
"Hide And Seek"
"(No) Commitment"
"Play To Win"
"Was It You"
"Later In The Garden"
"The Problem With A Street"
"Plan For Leaving"
"Are You Hurting"
"It Was The Style"
"The Fooler"
"Unreal,Immaterial"

Musician credits
Roberta Freeman - backing vocals
Carol Hatchett - backing vocals
Britt Manor - backing vocals

Production credits
Allah-Las – "Catamaran" – (45) Pres 2010
Allah-Las – "Tell Me (What's on Your Mind)" – (45) IL 2012
Allah-Las – "501-415" – (45) IL 2014
Allah-Las – S/T – (LP) Innovative Leisure 2012
Allah-Las – Worship The Sun – (LP) Innovative Leisure 2014
Paul Bergmann – "Summer's End" – (45) Fairfax Records 2015

References

1986 births
Living people
Guitarists from Los Angeles
Record producers from Los Angeles
Singer-songwriters from California
People from Huntington Beach, California
People from Santa Ana, California
21st-century American singers
21st-century American guitarists